Television broadcasting in Malaysia is provided by the federal government and respective private broadcasting companies. The government is committed to provide digital television to every Malaysian's household by end-2015 under DTTV (Digital Terrestrial Television) Project which is a part of national agenda by Ministry of Communications and Digital and managed by Malaysian Communications and Multimedia Commission (MCMC). The analogue transmissions were completely turned off on 31 October 2019 and switched to full myFreeview Digital TV broadcast using DVB-T2 technology. The switchover was done in stages by territory which begun in all peninsular states starting from the central and southern on 30 September 2019, north and east on 14 October 2019 and Sabah and Sarawak on 31 October 2019. The digital TV transmissions' Service Level Availability (SLA) currently stood at 99.9% coverage rate.

The first trial broadcasts of digital TV started in 2006 by government-owned Radio Televisyen Malaysia (RTM). Some local TV channels already are broadcasting shows in HD for special occasions since 2008. Free-to-air and subscription-based television channels in Malaysia are available in HD standards through terrestrial, satellite and IP, as well as over OTT platform.

Currently there is only two free-to-air digital terrestrial platform with high definition digital television channels in Malaysia, named as myFreeview and NJOI.

Government-owned television free-to-air broadcast channels

Radio Televisyen Malaysia (RTM)

Over-the-top (OTT)
 RTM Klik

Private television free-to-air broadcast channels

Media Prima Berhad

Awesome Media Network Sdn Bhd

DNF Group Sdn Bhd

Enjoy TV Broadcasting Sdn Bhd

Semi government television free-to-air broadcast channels

Alhijrah Media Corporation

Malaysia News National Agency (BERNAMA)

Sarawak Media Group (SMG)

Subscription-based providers

Satellite television
 Astro
 NJOI 
 Sirius TV

Digital terrestrial television
 myFreeview 
 NJOI (available for several free-to-air digital television channels)

IPTV
 Unifi TV

Over-the-top (OTT)
Astro GO 
Sooka
Tonton Cinema
 Netflix
 Eros Now
 SonyLIV
Crunchyroll
 ZEE5
 Disney+ Hotstar
My Wayang
EDUWEBTV
Film Wallet
iflix
Selangor TV
MYTV ManaMana

Other television stations
 Asia Media
 Vision Four

Former or defunct channels and networks

Former Astro channels (by timeline)
1998
Asia Business News and the original incarnation of CNBC Asia was merged to form CNBC Asia Business News on 1 February 1998 until Astro is now the 2nd Anniversary day from 4 months time.
CNBC Asia Business News rebranded to CNBC Asia on 1 July 1998.
NBC Asia rebranded to National Geographic Channel on 20 July 1998.
MGM Gold and Star Mandarin Movies was rebranded to Cinemax on 24 August 1998. 
2000 
Star Plus rebranded to Star World on 1 July 2000.
2006
TechTV ceased broadcasting and transmission on 1 March 2006.
NHK World TV was replaced with NHK World Premium on 1 May 2006.
2008
BBC World was rebranded to BBC World News on 21 April 2008.
Discovery Real Time was replaced with Discovery Turbo due to its rebranding in October 2008.
2009
Astro News (carries program from DW-TV, Al Jazeera and Australia Network) ceased transmission and broadcasting on 1 March 2009. Replaced with Astro Ria from Mio TV on 23 March 2009 while DW-TV programmes was carried by Bernama TV.
Astro @play ceased service on 1 May 2009 due to Mustika Pack launched and the insignificant number of subscribers.
Astro Kirana ceased broadcasting and transmission on 18 May 2009. Replaced by Astro Citra on 1 June 2009.
BBC Entertainment was replaced with BIO Channel on 1 December 2009.
2010
Eastern Television Asia was replaced with CTI TV on 1 January 2010.
Astro Aruna ceased broadcasting and transmission on 1 February 2010 due to low viewership. Replaced by Bintang and Pelangi on 11 July 2011.
CCTV-9 rebranded to CCTV News on 26 April 2010 at 7:00pm.
Channel [V] ceased transmission and broadcasting on 16 June 2010. Replaced by FOX Asia.
Hallmark Channel was replaced by Diva Universal on 19 September 2010.
Granada TV rebranded to ITV Granada on 1 November 2010.
2011
Playhouse Disney rebranded to Disney Junior on 11 July 2011.
2012
Star Movies rebranded to Fox Movies Premium on New Year's Day (1 January) 2012 at midnight.
WaTV ceased broadcasting and transmission on 1 March 2012. Replaced by Celestial Movies HD and KIX HD while programs broadcast by the channel is now carried by Astro AEC.
B4U was replaced by Astro Bella on 5 March 2012.
Astro @15 ceased transmission and broadcasting on 1 May 2012 at midnight. Replaced by Astro Mustika HD on 21 May 2012 to while programs broadcast by the channel were carried by other Astro's Malay channels.
Astro Lifestyle HD ceased broadcasting and transmission on 1 October 2012 at midnight. At 6am, Food Network was Channel 727 (now Channel 708) and Life Inspired (now TLC HD) was Channel 728 (now Channel 707). Both channels are 24-hour dedicated channels.
2013
Astro Stocklink ceased service on New Year's Day (1 January) 2013 at midnight.
ESPN Asia, ESPNews and ESPN HD rebranded to Fox Sports, Fox Sports News and Fox Sports Plus HD on 28 January 2013.
Radio Mosaic ceased service on 9 February 2013 due to the same broadcast of radio channels.
BIO Channel ceased broadcasting and transmission on 14 June 2013 at midnight. Replaced by Lifetime.
BeTV ceased broadcasting and transmission on 26 August 2013 at midnight. It was the first HD channel to be ceased on Astro. Replaced by HITS TV on 16 November 2014 at the same channel number (Channel 720) then moved to Channel 706 on 1 April 2020.
CNBC ceased broadcasting and transmission on 7 October 2013 because it was unable to fulfill these objects, but was relaunched back in the same month.
2014
FOX Family Movies had ceased transmission on 1 February 2014, but the HD version was relaunched on 16 November 2014 until it officially ceased broadcasting and transmission again on 30 September 2021 at 11:59:59pm.
Jia Yu ceased broadcasting and transmission on 1 April 2014 at midnight. A temporary channel was broadcast for a month before being relaunched on 1 May 2014 at 6:00am.
DIVA Universal was replaced with DIVA on 16 June 2014.
Discovery Turbo was replaced by DMAX on 7 July 2014.
Discovery Home & Health Asia changed its name to Eve on 1 August 2014.
Star Sports and Fox Sports Plus HD rebranded to Fox Sports 2 and Fox Sports 3 in which Fox Sports News was replaced by Fox Sports 3 on 15 August 2014. Fox Sports News remained its broadcast on Astro Go.
Astro Zhi Zun HD rebranded to Astro Wah Lai Toi HD (Channel 310) on 6 October 2014.
The SD version of FOX (Channel 710) officially ceased transmission and broadcasting on 16 November 2014. Officially upgraded to FOX HD (Channel 724) until FOX HD officially ceased broadcasting and transmission on 30 September 2021 at 11:59:59pm and was replaced by Disney+ Hotstar that officially launched on 1 June 2021.
2015
Astro On Demand Drama Preview was ceased broadcasting and transmission on 12 January 2015. Replaced by iView on the NJOI version  on 20 January 2015.
Golf Channel in SD ceased broadcasting and transmission on 26 February 2015.
2016
Astro Hitz ceased broadcasting and transmission on 16 May 2016 at midnight due to low viewership and declining popularity.
Sundance Channel ceased broadcasting and transmission on 1 July 2016 at midnight due to low popularity. The first International Movies channel to be ceased on Astro.
Zee Variasi ceased broadcasting and transmission on Astro on 1 October 2016 at midnight. Replaced by a new Hindi HD channel called Tara HD on 19 October 2016. 
CCTV News rebranded to CGTN on New Year's Eve (31 December) 2016 at 12:00pm.
2017
ITV Choice ceased broadcasting and transmission on Astro on 16 January 2017 at 12:15am due to low viewership.
Fox Movies Premium rebranded to Fox Movies on 10 June 2017.
Go ASEAN ceased broadcasting and transmission on 12 June 2017 at 2:00am. Go ASEAN remains its programmes on Tonton and DimSum.
Fox Sports News' broadcast on Astro Go ceased transmission and broadcasting on 29 April 2017.
Kah Lai Toi ceased broadcasting and transmission on 1 October 2017 at midnight due to low viewership.
Star World rebranded to Fox Life on 1 October 2017 at 9:00am. 
Life Inspired (except Food Network Asia) officially ceased broadcasting and transmission due to financial losses by the company on 7 October 2017 at midnight stroke.
2018
ZooMoo ceased broadcasting and transmission on 1 April 2018 to mitigate further losses by the company. ZooMoo shows moved to Astro Xiao Tai Yang.
Astro Mustika HD rebranded to Astro Citra HD on 1 October 2018 at midnight.
Astro Bella ceased broadcasting and transmission on 1 October 2018 at midnight due to low viewership. Replaced by Naura HD on the same package with completely different content.
Eve was discontinued and terminated on 1 November 2018.
Lifetime Asia and FYI were discontinued and terminated on 14 December 2018 (But Lifetime Channel Programming Block's revival on Hello officially ceased on 30 September 2021), until Lifetime Asia was officially relaunched back on 15 September 2021 along with BBC Earth, Paramount Network, BBC Lifestyle, Showcase Movies, HBO Hits and HBO Family. The replaced channels moved their channel numbers until 30 September 2021 at 11:59:59pm.
2019
Astro Maya HD ceased broadcasting and transmission on 14 January 2019 at midnight. The programs were later carried by the upgraded Astro Prima and Astro Oasis channels which are both 24-hour dedicated channels and its available to all Astro customers. For NJOI customers, HD version is made optional by purchasing the HD pack, while making SD version available on different channel number.
The SD version of Disney XD ceased broadcasting and transmission on 1 March 2019. The HD version of this channel remained until 1 January 2021 due to a review of Disney's business in the region and was replaced by TA-DAA on 15 March 2021.
Channel NewsAsia rebranded to CNA on 29 March 2019 as Channel NewsAsia celebrated its 20th anniversary.
Astro Xi Yue HD ceased broadcasting and transmission on 1 July 2019 at midnight because the Overseas event channel would be aired on Channel 338. It is the first Chinese HD channel to be ceased on Astro. Replaced by iQIYI HD starting 17 July 2019 on the same channel number (Channel 300).
A-List ceased broadcasting and transmission on 2 August 2019 at midnight due to low viewership, but its Astro OD (On Demand) service continued.
Tara HD was discontinued and terminated on 1 October 2019. Replaced by Colors Hindi HD at 6.00am.
2020
DIVA and E! Entertainment officially ceased transmission and broadcasting on New Year's Day (1 January) 2020 at midnight stroke as it ceased broadcasts across Asia while programmes on its VOD service and the Astro GO app continued reserved. Replaced by Comedy Central Asia on the same date at 6:00 am until it ceased broadcasting and transmission on 1 February 2021 because it officially ceased broadcasts across Asia while its VOD service continued reserved. They are the first historic channels to cease on Astro. DIVA and E! Entertainment shows were moved to Hello (Channel 702, previously Channel 110) but it was ceased on 1 October 2021 and transferred the shows to PRIMEtime.
Setanta Sports was rebranded to RugbyPass TV on 29 January 2020.
The SD version of Astro Wah Lai Toi officially ceased transmission and broadcasting on 1 April 2020, hence merged with TVB Jade HD. On 1 May 2020, Astro Wah Lai Toi HD was transitioned to its VOD service.
TVB Classic Movies and Asian Action Channel both ceased broadcasting and transmission on Astro on 5 April 2020 at 00:15 and 00:30 hours respectively under Jade pack.
Kompas TV and NET ceased broadcasting and ceased transmission as Bintang and Pelangi (offered under Indo Pek) on 1 June 2020 at midnight. In substitution, Astro introduced two new HD channels under Indo Pek offerings, SCTV and Indosiar are launched as Astro Rania HD and Astro Aura HD on 23 May 2020 and are also available in On-Demand and the Astro Go app.
Jaya TV, Raj TV and Kalaignar TV ceased broadcasting and transmission on 1 June 2020. Replaced by Zee Tamil HD at 00:05 hours.
Astro Vaanavil was upgraded from SD to HD on 1 June 2020, and made available for all Astro customers. For NJOI customers, the HD version is made optional by purchasing the HD pack, while retaining the SD version which are assigned to a different channel number.
The SD version of Astro First ceased broadcasting and transmission on 1 July 2020.
Astro Vellithirai and Astro Vinmeen HD ceased broadcasting and transmission from Singtel TV on 1 July 2020. Replaced by KTV HD and Sun Music.
The SD version of Astro Best ceased broadcasting and transmission on 29 July 2020 while still retaining the HD version of the channel.
The SD versions of Fox Sports channels and Eurosport ceased broadcasting and transmission on 16 November 2020 while still retaining the HD versions of the channels until the HD versions of Fox Sports channels ceased its broadcast on 1 October 2021.
The SD versions of Astro SuperSport channels ceased broadcasting and transmission on 30 November 2020 while still retaining the HD versions of the channels.
2021
Disney Junior and Disney Channel officially ceased broadcasting and transmission on New Year's Day (1 January) 2021 at midnight stroke due to the television provider's refreshed Kids Pack on 14 December 2020 and the officially grand launching and launching ceremony of Disney+ Hotstar in Malaysia on 1 June 2021 and were replaced by Nick Jr. HD and Boomerang HD which launched on the same date. Disney XD ceased broadcasting and transmission on New Year's Day (1 January) 2021 at midnight due to the review of Disney's business in this region and was replaced by TA-DAA! on 15 March 2021. These are the second Kids channels and first HD Kids channels to be ceased on Astro.
Comedy Central Asia (717) ceased broadcasting on 1 February 2021, surviving for barely 13 months after launch because it ceased broadcast in Asia, but its VOD service and the Astro GO app continued reserved (except for Unifi TV). It was replaced by BBC Lifestyle on same channel number on 15 September of the same year.
Almost all SD channels in Astro officially ceased broadcasting and transmission due to most channels are fully switched to all HD channels on 28 February 2021 at 11:59:59pm.
Astro Awani launches their HD version of their channel on 29 March 2021. While the upgrade from SD to HD are made available for all Astro customers, NJOI customers will still continue enjoy the channel in SD version on different channel number and HD version are made optional by purchasing the HD pack.
ANIPLUS on Astro Go ceased broadcasting and transmission on 1 April 2021 due to low viewership but its VOD service continued reserved until 11 April 2021.
 When Astro launched their new NJOI HD subscription-based package for NJOI customers on 28 April 2021, the HD version of Astro Prima, Astro Oasis, Astro Vaanavil, Astro Xiao Tai Yang, Astro AEC, CCTV4, Astro Awani, Hello, eGG and Astro Arena can be only be enabled via HD Pack, while retaining their SD version of these channels which are reassigned at different channel number.
Astro TVIQ was officially upgraded from SD to HD on 25 May 2021 and made available for all Astro customers.
Astro Box Office Tayangan Hebat ceased broadcasting and transmission on 1 June 2021, but its VOD service and the Astro GO app continued reserved.
TVB News Channel was officially discontinued and terminated on 1 July 2021, barely one year after launch due to copyright problems. TVB News programs on TVB Jade continued to be reserved at 7:00am, 6:30pm and 11:00pm until Astro has launched TVB Anywhere+ application on 13 September 2021.
All The Walt Disney Company, Fox Networks Group Asia Pacific channels (except Star Chinese Channel, National Geographic, Nat Geo Wild and BabyTV) officially ceased broadcasting and transmission on 30 September 2021 at 11:59:59pm and were replaced by Astro SuperSport 5, Astro Arena 2 (Channel 802) and SPOTV due to the officially grand launching and launching ceremony of Disney+ Hotstar in Malaysia on 1 June 2021. The Fox Sports channels are the first Sports channels to officially cease broadcasting and transmission on Astro.
Hello channel officially ceased broadcasting and transmission on 30 September 2021 at 11:59:59pm and was replaced by Lifetime and PRIMEtime which were officially opened and launched on 15 September 2021 and Discovery Science ceased broadcasting and transmission at the same date due to review of the channel performance and replaced by Astro's new Nature Channel, BBC Earth. They were first Learning channels to be ceased on Astro. At the same date, ART Variety was officially replaced with ART Movies before officially ceased broadcasting and transmission on 1 June 2022.
RugbyPass TV was officially rebranded to Premier Sports on 9 December 2021.
Animax officially ceased broadcasting and transmission on New Year's Eve (31 December) 2021 at 11:59:59pm because due to low popularity but its VOD service continued reserved.
2022
Astro TVIQ officially ceased broadcasting and transmission on Chinese New Year’s Eve (31 January) 2022 at 11:59:59pm when TA-DAA! launched on 15 March 2021 at 8:00am with the shows from the now-defunct channel are carried by Astro Ceria and TA-DAA!.
BabyTV officially ceased broadcasting and transmission on Chinese New Year’s Eve (31 January) 2022 at 11:59:59pm, with shows from the channel officially moved to Disney+ Hotstar in Malaysia. In turn, the channel slot was officially replaced by Moonbug Kids.
Naura HD officially ceased broadcasting and transmission on 31 January 2022 at 11:59:59pm because due to Naura content on its Astro GO app and its VOD service continued reserved.
Star Chinese Channel officially ceased broadcasting and transmission on the Chinese New Year’s Eve (31 January) 2022 at 11:59:59pm. While the shows from that channel will be carried through Disney+ Hotstar in Malaysia, it also was officially replaced by Phoenix Chinese Channel and Phoenix InfoNews Channel in Malaysia.
Astro Tutor TV PT3 and Astro Tutor TV SPM will be merging into single channel named Astro Tutor TV SMK HD on channel 603 starting 1 April 2022. On the same day, TVBS News, Astro AOD 353, Astro AOD 355 and Makkal TV has ceased transmission and Astro Tutor TV SK and OKEY will be upgraded to HD on channels 601 and 146.
Astro Vellithirai on Astro Go will cease transmission on 14 April 2022 at 1:00am, with the channel upgraded to HD at the same day.
Oh!K officially ceased broadcasting and transmission on 31 May 2022 at 11:59:59pm, along with ART Movies.
Kix officially ceased broadcasting and transmission on 1 July 2022 at 12:59:15am.
Chutti TV officially ceased broadcasting and transmission on 13 October 2022 and were replaced by Sun News, KTV HD and Sun Life.
2023
eGG Network officially ceased broadcasting and transmission on 23 January 2023 while retaining their social media pages. Programs carried by that channel and esports content were transferred to Astro Arena and Astro Arena 2.
National Geographic and Nat Geo Wild will cease to broadcast on 1 February 2023. While the programs hosted from both channels can be streamed in Disney+ Hotstar, their channel slots were replaced by Global Trekker and Love Nature on the same day.
Boomerang HD and TA-DAA! channel will cease to broadcast on 1 February 2023. Both channels were replaced by CBeebies and DreamWorks Channel on the same day.
Astro Go Shop Gaaya (Channel 120 & 150) ceased broadcasting and transmission on March 1, 2023.

Former Unifi TV channels
2013
 SS TV, replaced with Polimer Channel on 1 January 2013.
 Nat Geo Music, replaced by Channel [V] Music on 1 September 2013.
2014
KidsCo, ceased broadcasting and transmission on 10 February 2014. 
 Hypp Sensasi VOD has transitioned to Hypp Sensasi HD on 4 August 2014.
UTV Stars and TRACE Sports ceased broadcasting and transmission on 30 September 2014.
2015
All the Media Prima Radio Networks Stations ceased broadcasting and transmission on 1 March 2015.
BBC Entertainment was ceased broadcasting and transmission on 1 October 2015.
FOX Football Channel ceased broadcasting and transmission on 1 October 2015, replaced by FOX Sports 2 on 26 August 2016.
2016
 Red FM and Capital FM ceased broadcasting and transmission on 1 January 2016.
 Discovery Kids ceased broadcasting and transmission on 16 January 2016.
 FashionTV, ceased broadcasting and transmission on 1 May 2016.
 Hikmah, replaced by Hypp Salam on 5 June 2016.
 Astro SuperSport ceased broadcasting and transmission on 1 August 2016. Replaced by Fox Sports 3 on 26 August 2016.
 Astro SuperSport 2 ceased broadcasting and transmission on 1 August 2016. Replaced by Fox Sports News on 26 August 2016.
 Astro Vaanavil ceased broadcasting and transmission on 1 August 2016. Replaced by Zee Tamil on 1 April 2017. Later, Zee Tamil was replaced by Colors Tamil on 1 April 2019 respectively in HD only. 
 Makkal TV ceased broadcasting and transmission on 1 August 2016. Replaced by Zee TV on 1 April 2017. Later, Zee TV was replaced by Colors on 1 April 2019.
 Astro Oasis and Astro Awani ceased broadcasting and transmission on 1 August 2016.
 Dushh FM ceased broadcasting and transmission at 5 November 2016.
 TV Direct Showcase ceased broadcasting and transmission on 1 December 2016.
2017
MNC Channel, replaced by Pesona HD on 1 April 2017.
 Two UTV Bindass Television channels, Bindass and Bindass Play ceased broadcasting and transmission on 1 April 2017. Replaced by Zee Cinema, Sony SAB and Sony SET. Later, Zee Cinema, replaced by Colors Cineplex on 1 April 2019.
 Fox Sports News ceased broadcasting on 29 April 2017, barely 9 months after the channel launched.
 Syfy and Universal Channel ceased broadcasting and transmission on 1 July 2017.
HyppSports 4 ceased broadcasting and transmission on 1 July 2017. Replaced By Unifi Sports 4 on 28 February 2020.
 MTV Live HD was replaced by MTV Asia on 1 August 2017.
 Motorvision HD ceased broadcasting and transmission on 1 September 2017.
2018
Capital TV, replaced by Channel W on 3 January 2018.
 Channel [V] Music, Channel [V] and FOX Crime ceased broadcasting and transmission at midnight, 1 June 2018 due to low rating. First Chinese Channel to cease on Unifi TV, hence replaced by CJ WOW SHOP and Dunia Sinema.
 1News Channel ceased broadcasting and transmission at midnight, 1 July 2018 due to low popularity.
 HyppSports and HyppSports 2 ceased broadcasting and transmission at midnight, 1 August 2018 as ASN program suppliers ceased operations in Malaysia and Singapore, replaced by Sports Illustrated TV until broadcasts ceased on 1 May 2019.
 TVB8 and Stingray iConcerts was discontinued and terminated at midnight, 1 September 2018. Second Chinese Channel to cease on Unifi TV.
 Hot FM and One FM ceased broadcasting and transmission on 31 December 2018.
2019
Channel W, HyppSports 3 and Outdoor Channel ceased broadcasting and transmission at midnight, 1 January 2019 due to low popularity of Outdoor Channel.
 Now Chinese Drama International Version ceased broadcasting and transmission at midnight, 1 March 2019.
Sony Channel and MUTV, ceased broadcasting and transmission at midnight, 1 June 2019 due to low popularity of MUTV HD.
 Bloomberg Television and PlayBox channel were discontinued and terminated at midnight, 1 September 2019.
 RED by HBO and BabyFirst were discontinued and terminated at midnight, 1 October 2019.
 Now International was discontinued and terminated at midnight, 15 November 2019.
2020
 Baogu Movies transited to its VOD service on 1 March 2020.
 UTV Movies ceased broadcasting and transmission at midnight, 1 July 2020. Replaced by Yupp Thirai HD.
 Animax ceased broadcasting and transmission at the same date due to low popularity of Animax, but relaunched back on 1 October 2021.
2021
 Comedy Central Asia officially ceased broadcasting and transmission on 1 February 2021 but Comedy Central On Demand still available. Replaced by GEM starting 1 October 2021.
 All The Walt Disney Company and Fox Networks Group Asia Pacific channels was officially cease broadcasting and transmission on 30 September 2021 at 11:59:59pm. The shows from these terminated channels will be carried Disney+ Hotstar that was already launched in Malaysia.
2022
 Sony Max, Sony SAB and Sony SET officially ceased broadcasting and transmission on 1 January 2022.
 Colors TV, Jaya Max, Polimer and Yupp Thirai was ceased broadcast on 1st July 2022, replaced by WION, Sony YAY! and Zee Thirai.
2023
 Unifi Sports 2, 3 & 4 was cease broadcast and transmission in 1 February 2023 because the broadcaster rights of Malaysia League has ended. As an result, both of the channels will be replaced by BeIN Sports 2. 
 Laku Mall, TechStorm and Arirang TV was cease broadcast and transmission in 1 February 2023. In turn, these channels will be replaced by ONE and Moonbug Kids, However The TechStorm and Arirang TV Channel Relaunched Back In 1 July 2023

Former Tonton Live TV channels
2021
 CNA and Al Jazeera ceased broadcasting and transmission on 12 October 2021.

Former HBO GO live TV channels
2021
 RED by HBO ceased broadcasting and transmission on 1 July 2021 due to lack of advertisements.

Other pay television providers
2001
 Mega TV ceased transmission on 1 October 2001.
2016
 eTV ceased transmission on 29 February 2016.
 ABNXcess ceased transmission in 2016.
 Fine TV

TV channels
1999
 MetroVision ceased broadcasting and transmission on 1 November 1999 but relaunched as 8TV on 8 January 2004.
2005
 Channel 9 was for a hiatus on 1 February 2005. Replaced by TV9 on 22 April 2006.
2008
TV Pendidikan ceased broadcasting and transmission on 31 December 2008. Replaced by DidikTV KPM on 17 February 2021.
2012
 tvN, changed its name with Channel M on 23 November 2012, on 1 June 2016, the channel rebrands into current name.
WBC, closed down since October 2012 due to financial problems.        
2017
TVi was replaced with TV5 on 1 April 2017 (rebranded back with TVi on 8 April 2017) due to its rebranding.
 Hao Xiang Shopping Channel ceased broadcasting and transmission on 1 July 2017, replaced by LAKU Mall on 1 March 2018.
2018
TVi was replaced with TV Okey due to its relaunch on 21 March 2018.
2019
 CJ WOWSHOP ceased broadcasting and transmission on 1 January 2019. Later, CJ WOWSHOP officially broadcasting and transmission restore resume again from 15 April 2019 (excluding Unifi TV).
Channel W was discontinued on 1 April 2019, replaced by TVS at myFreeview on 6 February 2021.
2022
 Drama Sangat and Media Prima Audio (formerly Ripple Media) radio channels were discontinued and replaced by SUKE TV at myFreeview on 28 March 2022.
 Astro Go Shop (Malay) officially ceased broadcasting and transmission in myFreeview on 19 June 2022.
 WowShop (Chinese) officially ceased broadcasting and transmission in myFreeview on 2 November 2022.

References

Further reading
 

 
Stations